Sarungbam Bimola Kumari Devi is an Indian medical doctor and the Chief Medical Officer of Imphal west region in the Indian state of Manipur. She has been serving in the Manipur state medical service since 1979, mostly working in the rural areas and has headed the food safety office during two visits of Narendra Modi, the Prime Minister of India, to the state. Kumari, a recipient of the 2014 Dr. B. R. Ambedkar International Award, was honoured by the Government of India in 2015 with the Padma Shri, the fourth highest Indian civilian award.

References

Recipients of the Padma Shri in medicine
20th-century Indian medical doctors
Living people
People from Imphal West district
Scientists from Manipur
Indian Medical Service officers
20th-century Indian women scientists
Indian women medical doctors
20th-century women physicians
Year of birth missing (living people)